Polona Hercog and Barbora Záhlavová-Strýcová were the defending champions, but Záhlavová-Strýcová chose not to compete this year.
As a result, Hercog partnered up with Petra Martić. However, they lost in quarterfinals to Petra Cetkovská and Renata Voráčová.  
Mariya Koryttseva and Ioana Raluca Olaru defeated Lourdes Domínguez Lino and Arantxa Parra Santonja in the final, 3–6, 6–1, [10–4]

Seeds

  Jill Craybas /  Edina Gallovits-Hall (first round)
  Polona Hercog /  Petra Martić (quarterfinals)
  Anna-Lena Grönefeld /  İpek Şenoğlu (quarterfinals)
  Eleni Daniilidou /  Jasmin Wöhr (first round)

Main draw

Draw

References
 Main Draw

Abierto Mexicano Telcel - Women's Doubles
2011 Abierto Mexicano Telcel